Geh or GEH may refer to:

 Geh (surname)
 Ǵ, representing the Pashto letter geh (ږ)
 GEH statistic in modelling road traffic 
 GE Hitachi Nuclear Energy, an American nuclear technology company
 George Eliot Hospital, Nuneaton, England 
 Gesellschaft zur Erhaltung alter und gefährdeter Haustierrassen, a German conservation association
 Hutterite German dialect
 Triacylglycerol lipase, an enzyme